Despot Višković (born 3 March 1980) is a retired Serbian football defender.

Born in Zrenjanin, SR Serbia, he has played with Serbian clubs FK Mladost Apatin, FK Hajduk Kula, FK Radnički Beograd, FK Jedinstvo Ub and FK Srem Jakovo, FK Radnički Obrenovac, beside Chinese Qingdao Jonoon F.C. and Hungarian clubs Jászberény SE and Diósgyőri VTK.

External links
 Despot Višković at Srbijafudbal

1980 births
Living people
Sportspeople from Zrenjanin
Serbian footballers
Serbian expatriate footballers
FK Mladost Apatin players
FK Hajduk Kula players
FK Radnički Beograd players
FK Jedinstvo Ub players
FK Srem Jakovo players
FK Novi Pazar players
FK Radnički Obrenovac players
FK Srem players
Qingdao Hainiu F.C. (1990) players
Chinese Super League players
Jászberényi SE footballers
Diósgyőri VTK players
Expatriate footballers in Hungary
Expatriate footballers in Saudi Arabia
Expatriate footballers in China
Expatriate footballers in Finland
Serbian expatriate sportspeople in Hungary
Serbian expatriate sportspeople in Saudi Arabia
Serbian expatriate sportspeople in China
Serbian expatriate sportspeople in Finland
Association football defenders
FC YPA players